Mantovani and His Orchestra Play the Music of Victor Herbert is an album of music composed by Victor Herbert and performed by Mantovani and His Orchestra. It was released in 1953 by London Recordings (catalog no. LL 746). On June 6, 1953, it was listed by Billboard magazine as the best selling popular album in the United States.

Track listing
Side 1
 "Ah! Sweet Mystery Of Life"
 "When You're Away"
 "Neapolitan Love Song"
 "March Of The Toys"
 "Gypsy Love Song"
 "Kiss Me Again"
 "Indian Summer"

Side 2
 "To The Land Of My Own Romance"
 "Italian Street Song"
 "A Kiss In The Dark"
 "Habanera"
 "Sweethearts"
 "The Irish Have A Great Day Tonight"
 "I'm Falling In Love With Someone"

References

1953 albums
London Records albums
Mantovani albums